Ashburn is a census-designated place (CDP) in Loudoun County, Virginia, United States. At the 2010 United States Census, its population was 43,511, up from 3,393 twenty years earlier.

Ashburn is a major hub for Internet traffic, due to its many data centers. Andrew Blum characterized it as the "bullseye of America's Internet".

History
Ashburn was originally called "Farmwell" (variant names include "Old Farmwell" and "Farmwell Station") after a nearby mansion of that name owned by George Lee III. The name "Farmwell" first appeared in George Lee's October 1802 will and was used to describe the  plantation he inherited from his father, Thomas Ludwell Lee II. A section of Farmwell plantation west of Ashburn Road, a  tract, was purchased in 1841 as a summer home by John Janney, a Quaker lawyer who nearly became Vice President of the United States. Janney called the property "Ashburn Farm"; the name's first known appearance in writing is 1870 when he sold the property. It is likely he named the farm after family friends whose name was Ashburn.

The Ashburn Presbyterian Church, the Belmont Manor House, the Broad Run Bridge and Tollhouse, and Janelia Farm are listed on the National Register of Historic Places.

Geography
As drawn by the U.S. Census Bureau, the area counted as "Ashburn" extends north to Virginia State Route 7, east to Virginia State Route 28, and southwest to the Dulles Greenway (VA 267). The Ashburn CDP is bordered to the north by the Belmont, Lansdowne, One Loudoun, and University Center CDPs; to the east by the Kincora, Dulles Town Center, and Sterling CDPs; to the southwest by the Moorefield and Broadlands CDPs; and to the west by the Goose Creek Village CDP.

The area is drained by Broad Run, which flows northward through the eastern part of the CDP toward the Potomac River.

Subdivisions
The Ashburn CDP consists of many major and minor subdivisions such as Ashbrook, Ashburn Farm, Ashburn Village, the Courts and Ridges at Ashburn, and the Village of Waxpool.

Demographics

The United States Census Bureau defines Ashburn as a census-designated place (CDP). As of the 2010 census, the CDP had a population of 43,511 residents, while the larger ZIP Code Tabulation Area (ZCTA) for Ashburn's 20147 ZIP code contained 54,086 people.

Many of its residents commute into Washington, D.C. and the surrounding suburbs such as Tysons Corner and Reston to their places of employment. The median household income as of 2009 was $100,719. Median age in Ashburn is 31.6. Ashburn's population is made up of 49% males and 51% females.

The racial makeup of the CDP was 67.1% White (59.1% non-Hispanic White), 8.2% Black or African American, 0.2% Native American, 17.1% Asian, 0.0% Pacific Islander, and 5.4% from two or more races. Hispanic or Latino people of any race made up 11.8% of the population. The total number of households accounted for in Ashburn was 22,555. The median household size is 2.9 persons. 98% percent of Ashburn residents have a high school degree. Some 42 percent of Ashburn's population holds a four-year bachelor's degree; 18 percent holds graduate degrees.

Homeowners formed 80 percent of the population, renters made up 13% of the population, and 7% of housing units were listed as vacancies. The median age of housing was 5.0 years. The median housing value is at $345,000.

Economy
Located within the Dulles Technology Corridor, Ashburn is home to many high-tech businesses. World Trade Center Dulles Airport is the second World Trade Center in the state. Verizon Business has a major office in Ashburn at the location replacing MCI WorldCom's headquarters after its acquisition. Ashburn is also home to government contractor Telos.

Ashburn is a major hub for data centers, largely due to the Equinix location there. Among other websites, the Wikimedia Foundation (parent of Wikipedia) and Amazon Web Services have data centers there.

The George Washington University's Virginia Science and Technology Campus and the Howard Hughes Medical Institute's Janelia Research Campus are located north of Ashburn in the University Center and Lansdowne CDPs, respectively. INOVA Sports Performance Center, the training camp for the Washington Commanders of the National Football League, is located in the east part of Ashburn.

EADS North America (the European Aeronautic Defense and Space Company), renamed Airbus Group, Inc., a defense contractor headed by former NASA administrator Sean O'Keefe, has a second location in Ashburn in addition to the main office in Herndon, Virginia.

Government

Federal
The National Transportation Safety Board operates the Ashburn Aviation Field Office in Ashburn; it is the regional headquarters of the NTSB Aviation Eastern Region.

Education

Colleges and universities
George Washington University and Strayer University have campuses in the area. In December 2009, it was announced that George Mason University was planning to set up a campus in Ashburn, to be located at Exit 6 off the Dulles Greenway.

Primary and secondary schools

Educational institutions in Ashburn are operated by the Loudoun County Public Schools.

Ashburn's elementary schools include Ashburn Elementary School, Belmont Station Elementary School, Cedar Lane Elementary School, Creighton's Corner Elementary, Discovery Elementary School, Dominion Trail Elementary School, Hillside Elementary School, Legacy Elementary School, Madison's Trust Elementary, Mill Run Elementary School, Moorefield Station Elementary School, Newton-Lee Elementary School, Rosa Lee Carter Elementary School, Sanders Corner Elementary School, Steuart W. Weller Elementary School, and Sycolin Creek Elementary School.

Ashburn's public middle schools include Eagle Ridge Middle School, Farmwell Station Middle School, Stone Hill Middle School, Brambleton Middle School, Trailside Middle School, and Belmont Ridge Middle School.

Public high schools in Ashburn include Briar Woods High School, Broad Run High School, Independence High School, Riverside High School, Rock Ridge High School, and Stone Bridge High School.

There are six private schools in Ashburn: Loudoun School for Advanced Studies, St. Theresa Catholic School, Virginia Academy, Leport School, The Loudoun Country Day School, and County Christian School.

Media
Media covering Ashburn include Leesburg Today, and the Loudoun Times-Mirror.

Infrastructure

Washington Metro
Ashburn is served by two Washington Metro Silver Line stations. After passing through Dulles Airport, the Silver Line enters Ashburn in the median of the Dulles Greenway. The first stop in Ashburn is Loudoun Gateway station, with Ashburn station serving as the terminus. Originally planned to open in 2018, the opening was pushed back by multiple delays and finally opened on November 15, 2022.

Emergency services
Ashburn's fire and emergency medical services are provided by a combination of the volunteers of Ashburn Volunteer Fire-Rescue Department and the Loudoun County Department of Fire, Rescue & Emergency Management. AVFRD is a company under LCFR, and serves Ashburn with Stations 6 and 22, which is located next to Loudoun Hospital. LCFR operates the 24-7 career Moorefield Station 23, the first of its kind in the county.

Notable people

Jonathan Allen, Washington Commanders defensive end
J. B. Bukauskas, Major League Baseball player
Ashley Caldwell, freestyle skier, member of the US team for the 2010 Winter Olympics
Taylor Clarke, Major League Baseball player
Nate Davis, Tennessee Titans offensive lineman
Gina Haspel, former Director of the CIA
Carl C. Johnson, retired U.S. Army Air Force/U.S. Army officer and last Tuskegee Airmen cadet pilot graduate 
Trace McSorley, Arizona Cardinals quarterback
Wilson Pickett, singer

See also

 National Register of Historic Places listings in Loudoun County, Virginia
 Ashburn Presbyterian Church
 Belmont Manor House
Broad Run Bridge and Tollhouse
Janelia mansion, located on Janelia Farm Research Campus
 Ashburn Colored School
 Edelman Financial Field

References

External links

 Ashburn guide
 History of Ashburn

Census-designated places in Loudoun County, Virginia
Census-designated places in Virginia
Washington metropolitan area